The third-oldest university in England debate has been carried out since the mid-19th century, with rival claims being made originally by Durham University as the third-oldest officially recognised university (1832) and the third to confer degrees (1837) and the University of London as the third university to be granted a royal charter (1836). These have been joined more recently by University College London as it was founded as London University (1826) and was the third-oldest university institution to start teaching (1828) and by King's College London (which officially claims to be the fourth-oldest university in England but is claimed by some students to be the third-oldest as the third university institution to receive a royal charter, in 1829). Most (but not all) historians identify Durham as the third-oldest, following standard practice in how a university is defined and how this is applied historically, although the popular press is more divided.

Background
Following the establishment of Oxford University (by 1167) and Cambridge University (1209), the University of Northampton was founded in 1261 with a royal charter from Henry III. Students and tutors from Oxford were encouraged to take up places at the university which was founded at a studium, dating from Richard I (its location is unknown). A large Jewish learning community was also based in the town. Northampton's curriculum included law – as at Oxford and Cambridge – as well as other subjects such as the arts and humanities. It was this scholastic diversity that might have made Oxford feel threatened. However, within three years of its foundation, faculty members sided with supporters of Simon de Montfort, who was a patron of the university, during the siege of the town and its castle in April 1264. Less than a year later, Henry III abolished Northampton's charter on 1 February 1265 citing significant opposition from Oxford as the cause. His letter to the town burgesses stated:

In 1333, rebellious tutors and students from Brasenose College, Oxford tried to establish the University of Stamford in Lincolnshire, but Edward III ordered the rebels to return to Oxford after lobbying from both Oxford and Cambridge. After the suppression of the university at Stamford, graduates from the Universities of Oxford and Cambridge were required to swear oaths not to lecture outside those two universities, and concerted efforts were made by those universities against the foundation of any further universities in England for the next five centuries, during which time five universities opened in Scotland and over 100 on the continent of Europe.

After Durham College, Oxford was suppressed in 1540, Henry VIII planned to establish a college in Durham, but this came to nothing. Gresham College was established in London in 1596 to make university learning available there, but was academically dependent on Oxford and Cambridge and did not develop. Further proposals for a northern university included Ripon (in 1590, 1596 and 1604), York and Manchester in 1641, and Durham in 1651, as well as a University of London, taking in Gresham College. Durham was approved by Oliver Cromwell and letters patent were issued on 15 May 1657 to establish a college, but a petition for degree-awarding powers was denied by Richard Cromwell in 1660 following counter-petitions from Oxford and Cambridge, and the college closed with the restoration of the monarchy later in that year.

It was not until the early 19th century that a third university-level institution was successfully established, when University College London, King's College London, Durham University, and the University of London were all set up. There were unsuccessful proposals around the same time, including at York (1825), Leeds (1826), and Bath, Newcastle and Manchester in the 1830s.

History of the foundations
The five year period from 1828 to 1833 saw an unprecedented expansion of higher education in England, with three university-level institutions opening. The first was UCL, founded as a joint stock company under the name London University in 1826, which opened in 1828. Whether a university could be founded in this manner was hotly debated, with the institution being widely considered illegitimate, and it was denied official recognition. King's College was founded as a counter to UCL and was granted a charter in 1829, helped by not claiming to be a university or intending to award degrees. Durham was designed from its conception in 1831 to be a full university with degree-awarding powers but did not initially seek a royal charter. The university was instead founded under the authority of an Act of Parliament passed in 1832 and opened in 1833. In 1836 the University of London was established to solve the problem of having two competing colleges in London and to clarify their status, with UCL taking the name "University College, London". For the first time, England had higher education institutions besides Oxford and Cambridge that would maintain a sustained existence.

University College London

Following attempts by Henry Brougham in 1825 to establish the institution via a royal charter, which the government refused, or by an act of parliament, which was blocked by the influence of Oxford and Cambridge, UCL was established on 11 February 1826 as a joint-stock company under the name of "University of London". The foundation stone for the main building was laid by Prince Augustus Frederick, Duke of Sussex, a brother of King George IV, in 1827 and the college opened for teaching on 1 October 1828.

UCL applied for a charter in late 1830 or early 1831 that would grant it "Incorporation as an University, with all the privileges incident to that title", but without an explicit mention of degree-awarding power. In February of that year it was reported that "a charter, which now only awaits the royal signature, is to be granted to the University of London", but following opposition from Oxford and Cambridge the application for the charter stalled. The application was renewed in 1833, but again stalled with Oxford and Cambridge's opposition being joined by the London medical schools. In 1835 the House of Commons voted in favour of a petition to the king to grant a charter along the lines of that approved in 1831. However, the government chose instead to grant UCL a charter as a college, rather than as a university, and to found the University of London as a separate body.

Lord Brougham, the chair of UCL's council, told a meeting of the proprietors that accepting this charter meant surrendering their claim to be a university, saying "it went a little to his heart … to sink into a college when they had originally started as an university" but that "for his own part he would rather accept it", which the proprietors voted unanimously to do. It was described as "a barren collegiate Charter" by William Tooke, who had led the parliamentary campaign for UCL's recognition as a university, and John Robson, Secretary of UCL in the 1870s, told the Royal Commission on Scientific Instruction and the Advancement of Science in 1872 that "in March 1835, the House of Commons, by a large majority—246 to 136—adopted an address to the King, praying him to grant a charter of incorporation to 'the University of London,' which would have enabled it to grant degrees; and, consequently, that what the institution was asked to surrender in favour of the University founded in 1837 [sic], was not merely its designation, but the position which it had acquired through that vote of the House of Commons, and the importance of which had been distinctly recognized by successive Governments." An official history issued by the University of London in 1912 as a supplement to the calendar stated that "The friends and supporters of University College cordially welcomed the Government plan, although it gave them far less than they had at first demanded, and although acceptance of it implied the renunciation of all claim to exercise the full functions of a University, and placed them on a footing of equality with some younger and less important institutions."
In November 1838, the first UCL students matriculated in the new University of London and the first London degrees were awarded in May 1839.

UCL was not granted university status and the attendant right of awarding degrees during the 19th century, and it does not feature on 19th-century lists of universities in England. However the use of "university" in its name was known to cause confusion: in an article for the Journal of Education in 1888, Edith Wilson stated: "There are five, and only five, universities in England. (I begin by starting this explicitly because the name University College so often misleads even those familiar with the language of the educational world.) These five are Oxford, Cambridge, Durham, London, and Victoria."

After the University of London was reconstituted as a federal body in 1900, UCL surrendered its property and independence and was merged into the University of London under the 1905 University College London (Transfer) Act, which went into effect in 1907. It was not until 1977 that UCL once more became an autonomous institute, and not until 1993 that it (along with the other colleges) received government funding from HEFCE as an independent institution rather than getting an allocation from the University of London's grant. UCL received degree awarding powers on 27 September 2005, and the first UCL degrees were awarded in summer 2008. In 2019 UCL, along with King's and 10 other colleges of the University of London, applied for university status following the passing of the University of London Act 2018.

King's College London

King's College London was established by Royal Charter on 14 August 1829 as "King's College, London", a reaction to UCL with the aim of providing an Anglican education. KCL was able to receive its charter quickly in part because it was not seeking to become a university, and in part because of its outlook on religion being an essential part of education – both in sharp contrast to its rival. The existence of King's also gave the establishment another excuse to deny UCL university status: it would mean doing the same for King's, creating two universities for one city. This eventually led to the compromise of
forming the University of London to examine students from both colleges. It was chartered as a college, not a university; the term "university" does not appear in the charter. The 150th anniversary history of the college states that: "No attempt was to be made to form a University which had the power of conferring its own degrees: the task of King’s College was to prepare men for a commercial career, or for other universities if they sought after a degree or ordination."

The college opened its doors to students in 1831. Students at King's either left for degrees at Oxford and Cambridge, gained medical qualifications through the Royal Colleges, or (from 1834) took the Associate of King's College (first awarded in June 1835); the college did not award degrees of its own.

Following the establishment of the University of London in 1836, King's became an associated college of that university, allowing its students to sit examinations for London degrees. However, students were still encouraged to take the AKC rather than the London degree – which was also open to "godless" UCL students. It also made agreements with Durham and Edinburgh to allow King's College London students to take degrees at those universities with only one year of residence.

King's surrendered its autonomy to be merged into the University of London from 1910 to 1980, and was funded as an independent institution rather than through the University of London after 1993. King's gained degree awarding powers in July 2006, awarding its first degrees in summer 2008. In 2019 King's, along with UCL and 10 other colleges of the University of London, applied for university status following the passing of the University of London Act 2019.

Durham University

Durham University had its formal beginnings in an act of the Chapter of Durham Cathedral on 21 September 1831 that established an "Academical Institution or College or University", followed by a second act of Chapter on 28 September which resolved to accept "A plan of an academic institution, to be called Durham College, in connexion with the Dean and Chapter". By December of that year, the "college" was being advertised as a "university", with the prospectus appearing in London newspapers. On 4 July 1832, Parliament passed "An Act to enable the Dean and Chapter of Durham to appropriate Part of the Property of their Church to the Establishment of a University in connexion therewith for the Advancement of Learning".  Students were admitted to degree programmes from 28 October 1833, with the first calendar (autumn 1833) advertising the institution as "University of Durham founded by Act of Chapter with the Consent of the Bishop of Durham 28 September 1831. Constituted a University by Act of Parliament 2nd and 3rd William IV., Sess. 1831-2." However, the act did not directly found the university, rather it authorised the cathedral chapter to establish the university. This it did formally with an Act of Chapter on 4 April 1834, which resolved "that the Academical Institution or College or University established by Act of Chapter, 21st September 1831, be constituted a University".

Following its opening in 1833, the university awarded its first Licence in Theology (which only required a one-year course for those who were already graduates of Oxford, Cambridge or Dublin) in 1834. The first exams for the Bachelor of Arts were held in 1836 and the first exams for the Master of Arts in 1837. Following the practice of Oxford, the first BAs were conferred a year later, in 1837. The first honorary degree, a Doctor of Civil Law, was conferred on Earl Grey in 1838 for his support as Prime Minister of the establishment of the university.

The university was referred to as "the University of Durham" in two public acts of parliament prior to the granting of its charter: the Municipal Corporations Act 1835, and the Established Church Act 1836. Durham was incorporated by a royal charter granted on 1 June 1837, which explicitly referred to the university already having "established under our Royal sanction, and the authority of our Parliament", and the first degrees were conferred on 8 June 1837. This charter did not establish the university but rather confirmed the university status of the existing body. The explanatory memorandum to the 1907 University of Durham Act states that "The University was established in 1834 by a Statue of the dean and chapter of the cathedral church of Durham, made in pursuance of an Act of Parliament of 1832, and was incorporated by Royal Charter in 1837 under the name of the 'Warden, Masters, and Scholars of the University of Durham.

The Attorneys and Solicitors Act 1837, which extended various privileges related to admission to the legal profession of Oxford, Cambridge and Dublin graduates to Durham and London, similarly confirmed that Durham was established as a university under the authority of the 1832 act and that the effect of the 1837 charter was to incorporate the pre-existing university, in contrast to London which waas established by royal charter. The act states "And whereas … a Body Politic and Corporate by the Name of the University of London has been constituted by the Royal Charter of His late Majesty King William the Fourth, and an University having been founded and established in connexion with the Cathedral Church at Durham under the Authority of an Act passed in the Second and Third years of the Reign of His said late Majesty … And whereas since the passing of the said last-mentioned Act a Royal Charter of Incorporation had been granted to the University of Durham".

University of London

The University of London was established and chartered in 1836 as a degree awarding body. It received a second charter in 1837, a third in 1858 and a fourth in 1863, under which it is now incorporated. It matriculated is first students in November 1838 (from UCL and King's College London) and awarded its first degrees in May 1839 (again to students from UCL and King's College London). In 1900 it was reconstituted as a federal university by statutes drawn up under the University of London Act 1898, including as schools of the university both UCL and King's College London, along with a number of other colleges in London.

London was incorporated under its 1836 charter "during Our Royal Will and Pleasure". Sources give differing interpretations on what this meant, with some saying the charter expired on the death of William IV (20 June 1837), and others that it may never have been valid but if it were it would have expired 6 months after the king's death (i.e. 20 December 1837). The university was re-incorporated by a second Royal Charter on 5 December 1837. This date is sometimes given in Victorian sources as the founding of the University, and is the date used as the date of creation in the supplemental charter of 1850 and the charters of 1858 and 1863.

As founded, the University of London was "an examining board appointed by the government", and the lack of teaching in the university led to criticism that it was not a true university. Henry Wace, Principal of King's College London told a Royal Commission said in 1888 that he "had two … objections to the title of the University of London: one, that it is not a University, and the other that it is not of London".  In a similar vein, Karl Pearson, a professor at UCL, said that "[t]o term the body which examines at Burlington House a University is a perversion of language, to which no charter or Act of Parliament can give a real sanction". Some modern historians have taken a similar line, describing the University of London of that era as "a Government department, in the form of a board of examiners with power to matriculate students and award degrees … it had the trappings of a university, but not its most obvious function – it did not teach", and as "what would today be called a quango". The problems thrown up by the lack of teaching in the university led eventually to its reconstitution as a federal teaching and research institution in 1900.

Degree awarding powers

Related to the question of university status was the question of degree awarding powers. At this period, "the absence of a Royal Charter was generally held to deny degree-giving powers to a body with no outside authority for calling itself a university". Thus, although various objections were raised to the granting of a charter to UCL, all of the opposing parties agreed that a grant of university title would confer the right to award degrees as incident upon that title. Without an official grant of university title, UCL did not grant degrees, and a proposal in 1830 to introduce a degree of "M. Med. et Chir. U. L." was not carried out, although legal controls on unrecognised degrees were not introduced until the Education Reform Act 1988. When Brougham (then Lord Chancellor) asked during the debate on UCL's application for a charter in the Privy Council in 1834, "Pray, Mr. Bickersteth, what is to prevent the London University [i.e. UCL] granting degrees now?" he received the reply: "The universal scorn and contempt of mankind."

William Tooke, who led the parliamentary campaign for the recognition of UCL as the University of London, told the House of Commons in 1833 that: "It is not generally known, that no university whatever is entitled to confer degrees, by grant of any Charter whatever, the claim so to do being considered as incident to the name and title of University". Similarly, Sir Charles Wetherell, arguing against the grant of a university charter to UCL before the Privy Council in 1834 said that: "It will be necessary to examine this subject a little more minutely, and particularly with reference to the power of conferring degrees, and the nature of a university. The only place where I can find any legal discussion on matters so little brought under consideration as these, is the argument of Mr. Attorney General Yorke, in Dr. Bentley's case, which is reported in 2nd Lord Raymond, 1345 ... In this proposition of Mr. Yorke two principles are laid down. The first is that 'granting degrees flows from the Crown'; and the second is, that if 'a University be erected, the power of granting degrees is incidental to the grant'. ... The subject matter granted, is the power of covering degrees; an emanation, as Mr. Yorke expresses it, from the Crown. It is the concession of this power that constitutes the direct purpose and the essential character of a University."

However, disputes over Durham's powers demonstrated that it was not clear that being granted the status of a university conferred degree awarding powers. The liberal Sir William Hamilton, wrote a response to Wetherell's argument before the Privy Council in the Edinburgh Review arguing that historically the power to award specific degrees was explicitly granted, and thus the recognition of an institution as a university did not, in itself, grant any power to award degrees: "But when it has been seriously argued before the Privy Council by Sir Charles Wetherell, on behalf of the English Universities … that the simple fact of the crown incorporating an academy under the name of university, necessarily, and in spite of reservations, concedes to that academy the right of granting all possibly degrees; nay when (as we are informed) the case itself has actually occurred, – the "Durham University", inadvertently, it seems, incorporated under that title, being in the course of claiming the exercise of this very privilege as a right, necessarily involved in the public recognition of the name – in these circumstances we shall be pardoned a short excursus, in order to expose the futility of the basis on which this mighty edifice is erected."

Hamilton went on to conclude: "In like manner, in all the Universities throughout Europe, which were not merely privileged, but created by bull and charter, every liberty was conferred not as an incident, through implication, but by express concession. And this in two ways: – For a University was empowered, either by an explicit grant of certain enumerated rights, or by bestowing on it implicitly the known privileges enjoyed by certain other pattern Universities. These modes were frequently conjoined, but we make bold to say, that there is not to be found, throughout Europe, one example of a University erected without the grant of determinate privileges, – far less of a University, thus erected, enjoying, through this omission, privileges of any, far less of every other. – In particular, the right of granting degrees, and that in how many faculties, must (in either way) be expressly conferred."  However, historians have not agreed with this conclusion. Hastings Rashdall states that "the special privilege of the jus ubique docendi [the precursor to the modern degree] … was usually, but not quite invariably, conferred in express terms by the original foundation-bulls; and was apparently understood to be involved in the mere act of erection even in the rare cases where it is not expressly conceded". Patrick Zutshi, Keeper of Manuscripts and University Archives in Cambridge University Library, writes that "Cambridge never received from the papacy an explicit grant of the ius ubique docendi, but it is generally considered that the right is implied in the terms of John XXII's letter of 1318 concerning Cambridge's status as a studium generale."

William van Mildert, the Bishop of Durham, had said during the passage of the act in 1832 that "[N]or ought the privilege of conferring degrees, if hereafter committed to the University by charter, to be thrown open indiscriminately to non-conformists of every description, in common with members of the Established Church." In a similar vein, William Clayton Walters, a Newcastle barrister who the university consulted with, said in 1832 that there was nothing the university wanted from a royal charter at that time "except the power to grant degrees". However, by 1833 Thorp wrote to Van Mildert that "the Dean and Chapter are anxious to ascertain the place and value of the Degrees in due time to be conferred by virtue of the Act of Parliament which constitutes Durham a University". Subsequently, the university announced in 1835 that it would confer degrees, after taking further legal advice from Walters as to whether it had the authority to do so under the Act of Parliament, and just over a month later passed a "fundamental statute" that included provision for the awarding of degrees.

After Van Mildert's death in February 1836, Thorp wrote to the Prime Minister, Lord Melbourne, noting that degree awarding powers might be "inherent in a University instituted by the highest authority of the nation", but that it would be desirable to have either a charter or a legal declaration that one was unnecessary (no response is recorded). The university again sought Wetherell's counsel on the matter of the charter in March, and were advised to avoid mention of degree awarding powers but solely to seek incorporation as a university; stating that both his personal opinion and the orthodox opinion were that "the word university carries degrees". The petition submitted followed this advice, omitting mention of degrees and seeking only incorporation and the power to hold property. The opinion of the Chapter of Durham Cathedral (the governors of the university) in 1837 remained that the university had the power to award degrees under the 1832 Act of Parliament and that, although a royal charter would enhance the perception of those degrees, the university would proceed to award degrees that year whether or not a charter was issued. However, this was not put to the test as the charter was granted.

Timeline

References for the dates given in this table can be found in the sections above.

History of the debate

The debate over which is the oldest of the universities founded in the early 19th century has been going on (originally between London and Durham) since at least the mid 19th century. Durham was referred to as England's third university in 1841. In 1853, however, Lord Brougham secured London's precedence in the Charitable Trusts Act on the grounds of it having the earlier charter; but in the Medical Act 1858 Durham was given precedence. The topic also came up in the House of Commons during a speech by the Chancellor of the Exchequer at the committee stage of the Reform Act 1867, the chancellor originally claiming that London was the older but accepting a correction that "Durham is the older University". At the opening of the Victoria University in 1880, the Duke of Devonshire (who had been the first chancellor of the University of London, was chancellor of Cambridge University, and was being installed as the first chancellor of the Victoria University) was reported in Manchester and Leeds as saying in his speech that Durham predated London, but in Dundee as saying the opposite. Dod's Peerage, Baronetage and Knightage stated that precedence should be given to London, giving the dates of foundation as those of the royal charters. Durham, however, was given precedence at the quatercentenary of the University of Aberdeen in 1906, and was also named as the elder in a 1905 article by Richard Claverhouse Jebb, president of the Educational Science Section of the British Association for the Advancement of Science.

This early period of debate appears to have all but ended by 1906, when Sir Arthur William Rucker, principal of the University of London, named Durham as the third University to be successfully established in England in a speech to a delegation from Paris and other French universities who were visiting the University of London, although Viscount Bryce named London as the elder in a speech at the University of Liverpool in 1914. Through most of the 20th century, Durham's claim appears to have gone unchallenged. It was named as the "third oldest university in England" in the Proceedings of the International Assembly of the Inter-state Post-Graduate Medical Association of North America in 1930; Lord Londonderry (Durham's Chancellor) called it "in some sort the mother of modern universities in the United Kingdom" in 1931; the Society of Chemical Industry referred to Durham as "the third University to be established in England" in 1937; a guide published by the Universities Bureau of the British Empire and the British Council in 1937 gave (for the non-ancient universities) the order Durham, London, Manchester, etc.; the press repeatedly named it as third oldest; it was named as "the third oldest University in the country" in Parliament in 1962; Dod's, who had earlier given precedence to London, revised their listing in the 1960s in favour of Durham; and social anthropologist Joan Abbott recorded in 1971 that "The fact that Durham is the third oldest university in England was the first thing the author was told again and again soon after arrival".

In 1986, however, London's claim was reasserted by Negley Harte in his 150th anniversary history. Durham's claim was also directly disputed by UCL in 1998. All three of the claimants have often since asserted that they are the third oldest, and thus all have featured in the press identified as such over the last 20 years. Both The Independent's and the Daily Telegraph's university guides have hedged their bets, giving the title to both UCL and Durham, while referring to King's College London as "the fourth oldest university institution". King's students, however, have pushed their claim to be the third oldest university. The debate also spilled over into Scotland in 2007, when The Guardian mistakenly called Durham the "third oldest university in the UK" (rather than in England). In 2016, Durham Magazine published an article on the debate, concluding that "Despite all the above arguments, most people consider Durham to be England's third oldest university". The Telegraph noted the debate in 2018, saying  "Durham University claims to be the third oldest university in England (a title also claimed by University College London)".

Defining a university
Judging a university's foundation as occurring at the earliest point to which teaching can be traced, the establishment of predecessor institutions, the institution's foundation by Act of Parliament, royal charter or otherwise, its incorporation, or its date of formal recognition as a university all produce different results.

Formal definition

Formally, a university is an institution that has been granted the right by the government to use the title of university. Durham was named as a university in the Durham University Act 1832 as well as in the Municipal Corporations Act 1835 and the Established Church Act 1836, prior to the University of London, receiving the title in its risk charter in 1836.

However, while this usage was standard for most of the 19th and 20th centuries (e.g. the enumeration of universities in the Robbins Report  counts only those formally granted the status, referring to the University of London as a "congeries (collection) of university institutions"), by the 1990s the usage of "university" had extended to take in colleges of London (and Wales) in the Dearing Report. This was at least in part due to the decrease of the power of the central University of London and the concomitant rise in status of the colleges, which had gained the right to confer London degrees themselves and direct access to government funding in the early 1990s. In its modern usage "university" thus often takes on the meaning of de facto rather than de jure university. By the formal definition, both UCL and King's remain colleges of the University of London rather than universities in their own right.

This is part of the definition used by the European University Association's four-volume series, A History of the University in Europe, which lists Durham as the third oldest university in England (from 1832) with London as the fourth oldest (from 1836) and UCL and King's only as colleges of London. The full definition used is "institutions of higher education founded or recognized as universities by the public authorities of their territory and authorized to confer academic degrees in more than one discipline", thus excluding single-faculty universities (which is unimportant for this debate).

Royal charters

By date of earliest royal charter, King's College London is the oldest of the four institutions, chartered in 1829. However, its charter was as a college rather than as a university; the first institute to be chartered as a university was the University of London in 1836.

Neither Oxford nor Cambridge, the oldest two universities in England (founded pre-1116 and in 1209 respectively) were founded by Act of Parliament or royal charter (charters were bestowed on Oxford and Cambridge in 1248 and 1231 respectively, although neither is still in force), and both owe their incorporation to an act of parliament in 1571. No university in Britain was founded by grant of a royal charter to the institution prior to London in 1836.

From 1836 to 1992, in contrast, only one university (Newcastle, established by Act of Parliament) was not founded by royal charter. These charters were often accompanied by acts of parliament to transfer the property and obligations of predecessor institutes to the newly founded university. The danger of dating by earliest royal charter is demonstrated by listing the ancient universities by accepted date of establishment, date of royal charter, and date of incorporation; it can be seen that dating by royal charter or incorporation gives a significantly different ordering from the historically-accepted dates.

Durham University's 1837 charter is now the oldest current royal charter of any university in England. Having been rechartered on three occasions, London's current charter (its fourth) is from 1863, while UCL's is from 1977 and King's College London's from 2009.

Dictionary definitions

Modern dictionaries use multiple factors to define "university". The OED goes for "A high-level education institution in which students study for degrees and academic research is done" while Collins Dictionary uses "An institution of higher education having authority to award bachelors' and higher degrees, usually having research facilities".

Both of these have three components: education, degrees and research, but the balance between them is different. Collins makes research usual, rather than necessary, while the OED only requires students to study for degrees, but does not require that the institution has the power to award degrees itself.

While research was not as important to universities in the 19th century as it is today, UCL, King's and Durham all had staff engaged in research from the start (e.g. Edward Turner at UCL and James Finlay Weir Johnston at Durham). With reference to the OED definition, students at Durham studied for degrees from 1833, while at UCL and King's the first students matriculated in the University of London in 1838. The Collins definition requiring both education and degree awarding powers, would be met by 1837 at the latest by Durham (depending on the date taken for its degree awarding powers) but while London had the degree awarding powers it was an examining body rather than an educational institution until its reform in 1900, and UCL and King's were both educational institutions but without degree awarding powers of their own until the 21st century.

Older dictionaries use a variety of definitions. Johnson's Dictionary has "a school where all the arts and faculties are taught and studied" (or, in the 'miniature' edition, "a general school of liberal arts"). Other dictionaries followed Johnson in using this definition, and it was used to claim that UCL could not be a university as it did not teach all the liberal arts (omitting theology). This definition was also followed by John Henry Newman in his Idea of a University, where he defined a university as "a place of teaching universal knowledge". This would appear to favour King's College (where theology was taught), but has been shown to be due to a false etymology.

Other 19th-century dictionaries build on this. One (from 1824) has "a collection of colleges, where all the liberal arts are taught". This adds to Johnson's definition the idea that a university must consist of colleges. Again, this was used to attack UCL, but was shown to be false by reference to the Scottish universities.

This concept is also seen in the definition (from 1848): "A college, incorporated for the education of youth, in all the liberal arts, sciences, &c., and empowered to confer degrees. A university generally comprehends many colleges, as is exemplified in those of Oxford and Cambridge, in England." Here it is only general, rather than a rule, and confined to England, but Johnson's concept of teaching all the liberal arts is still present, and the idea that degree awarding powers form part of the definition is now present.

Some 19th-century dictionaries go a different route. One (from 1849) defines 'university' with: "Originally, any community or corporation; the whole body of students, or of teachers and students assembled, in a place of education, with corporate rights, and under bye-laws of their own—the name was also held to imply that all branches of study were taught in a university: in the modern sense of the term, a university is an establishment for the purposes of instruction in all, or some of the most important divisions of science and literature, and having the power of conferring certain honorary dignities, called degrees; in some old authors, university means the world."  While this mentions Johnson's definition it sets it apart from the "modern sense", which is a more general concept of education (which need only include some branches of knowledge) and degree awarding powers that is similar (except for not mentioning research) to modern definitions.

Vaisey criteria
The only judgment in English law, on the defining criteria of a university, is the decision of Mr Justice Vaisey in St David's College, Lampeter v Ministry of Education (1951) in the Chancery Division. The judgement gives six "essential qualities" that a university should possess, namely that it must:
"be incorporated by the highest authority, i.e. the sovereign power";
"be open to receive students from any part of the world";
"[have] a plurality of masters";
"[teach] at least one of the higher faculties" i.e. theology; law or philosophy; medicine;
"[have] residents either in its own buildings or near at hand";
"have the power to grant its own degrees" ("the most obvious and most essential quality of a university").

St David's College possessed most of these, but it did not qualify because of "limited [degree-awarding] powers...and the absence of an express intention [to make] it a university by the sovereign power".

From the Vaisey principles, assuming them all to be applicable, the ordering of when the "prime contenders" below (see discussion there for references) achieved university status is:
Durham University: 1837 (incorporation)
University of London: 1900 (plurality of masters; teaching higher faculties)
University College London: 2005 (degree awarding powers)
King's College London: 2006 (degree awarding powers)

Both Durham (1832) and London (1836) could be considered as having been expressly made universities by the sovereign power (royal assent to an Act of Parliament in Durham's case, royal charter in London's), making them universities whether they fulfilled all the criteria or not. Thus Masters could write in 1862 that "the distinctive character of the Universities of Oxford and Cambridge is, that they are corporations of Teachers in Arts, having the power to grant Degrees. This is Huber's idea; and it would appear to be his opinion that this is the essential character of a University : but we shall learn in the sequel that of the three elements here commingled, only two are common to all Universities of modern date".

Besides the question of defining a university, there is the question of what is meant by "third oldest university". The above listing assumes that it means the third institution to achieve university status, but if "third oldest university" means the third oldest institute to have eventually achieved university status (as defined above), then date of foundation is all that is being assessed and the list looks very different:
University College London: 1826 (deed of settlement)
King's College London: 1829 (royal charter)
Durham University: 1832 (Act of Parliament)
University of London: 1836 (royal charter)

By selectively choosing the meaning of the question and the factors used to assess university status, many different orderings can be produced.

Incorporation
The first criterion, incorporation, does not apply to all modern universities, some of which are unincorporated trusts under Church of England dioceses, and others are parts of larger, for-profit, corporations. "Sovereign power" might also be seen to exclude any modern university that gained its title through the Companies House route.

It could be similarly argued that it did not apply in the early 19th century, when the University of Edinburgh (which was indisputably recognised as a university) was a trust under the town corporation. This is important for the debate as neither UCL not Durham were founded as corporations.
If trusts under corporations fall within the definition, then Durham (as a trust under Durham Cathedral established by Act of Parliament) qualifies from 1832, otherwise only from 1837. UCL was not founded by "sovereign power", but as an unincorporated joint stock company, similar to the modern Companies House route.

Teaching and Residents
The next three criteria are taken from Hastings Rashdall's definition of mediaeval studium generale. UCL, King's and Durham meet these from early on, Durham specialising in theology and the London colleges in medicine, but London did not have a teaching rule until it became a federal university in 1900.

The fifth criterion, residents, would appear to imply that universities must be residential. This was certainly not the case in the early 19th century as the Scottish universities were non-residential. The London colleges followed this pattern (as did the redbrick university colleges later on the century), although Durham followed Oxford and Cambridge in being residential. It also does not apply to the modern era, with both the Open University and the University of Arden being distance-learning institutes.

Degree awarding powers
The sixth criterion, degree awarding powers, was the subject of debate at the time, as discussed below under Durham. One side held that degree awarding powers were essential to a university,
and thus a grant of university title automatically implied degree awarding powers (as proposed by Tooke and Wetherell amongst others). The other, alternatively, believed that degree awarding powers were separate from, and hence not essential to, university title, and had to be explicitly granted (e.g. by royal charter), as held by Hamilton (and, to judge from his statement in the House of Lords, by Van Mildert).

Hamilton claimed that "University, in its proper and original meaning, denotes simply the whole members of a body (generally, incorporated body,) of persons teaching and learning one or more departments of knowledge; and not an institution privileged to teach a determinate circle of sciences, and to grant certificates of proficiency (degrees) in any fixed and certain department of that circle (faculties)" (emphasis in original), by which definition UCL would clearly be the third oldest.

He goes on to claim that "every liberty conferred was conferred not as an incident, through implication, but by express concession." The two ways in which this could be done were "either by an explicit grant of certain enumerated rights, or by bestowing on it implicitly the known privileges enjoyed by certain other pattern Universities", concluding that "we make bold to say, that there is not to be found, throughout Europe, one example of a University erected without the grant of determinate privileges,—far less of a University, thus erected, enjoying, through this omission, privileges of any, far less of every other.—In particular, the right of granting degrees, and that I'm how many faculties, must (in either way) be expressly conferred."

Contrary to this, however, Rashdall states that "the special privilege of the jus ubique docendi [the precursor to the modern degree] … was usually, but not quite invariably, conferred in express terms by the original foundation-bulls; and was apparently understood to be involved in the mere act of erection even in the rare cases where it is not expressly conceded". Cambridge is an example of this: "Cambridge never received from the papacy an explicit grant of the ius ubique docendi, but it is generally considered that the right is implied in the terms of John XXII's letter of 1318 concerning Cambridge's status as a studium generale." Furthermore Edinburgh (Hamilton's own university) was granted the rights of the other Scottish universities by Act of Parliament in 1621, but conferred its first degrees in 1587 without any explicit grant of privileges. This would appear to support the contention of the 18th century Attorney General Philip Yorke (quoted by Wetherell) that "If the Crown erects a university, the power of conferring degrees is incident to the grant".

Academic studies

It is unsurprising that history books about institutions and aimed at the general public should support the claim of the institution backing them, but other studies have also touched upon the question. As noted above, A History of the University in Europe lists Durham as the third oldest university in England, and Oxford historian William Whyte similarly states: "Thus it was that the first new university for almost 250 years was founded—and funded—by the amply endowed Bishop of Durham. Durham University was established by Act of Parliament in 1832 and granted a Royal Charter five years later in 1837." The Handbook of Comparative Higher Education Law follows the legal definition of a university, saying "In the 1830s the creation of the Universities of Durham (1832) and London (1836) finally ended the Oxbridge monopoly". The historian and politician Sir John Marriott also named Durham as the third university, saying "A third University had been established at Durham in 1832, and four years later London University came into being, but only as an examining body, until in 1900 it was endowed with the full status of a teaching University with a number of constituent colleges." Other historians generally concur, with some stating that "using the date of the incorporating Act of Parliament or Royal Charter as the founding date" is "accepted practice" in naming Durham as third.

However, the consensus on Durham is not absolute. The International Dictionary of University Histories acknowledges the existence of the debate in its essay on Durham, stating that: "Durham is often referred to as England's third university, after Oxford and Cambridge. Yet it is also often referred to as England's fourth, on the assumption that London preceded it, for University College London had been opened in 1828. The difficulty can only be resolved according to one's definition of what a university is. Those who define a university as an institution which teaches advanced courses favor London over Durham. Those who emphasize the power to award degrees do the same, since the University of London, which absorbed the College in 1836, was granted that power the same year, while Durham received its a year later. But those who prefer the British legal definition give Durham priority, since it received a royal charter four years before London did and, in any event, a college is not the same as a university." Yet the essay on London in the same volume, by the same author, states unequivocally: "Thus the federal university was created as the fourth university in England, just four years after the University of Durham had been founded as the third." Some historians acknowledge that UCL was founded to be a university before becoming a college of the University of London. Some historians also disagree with the assertion that London gained its degree awarding powers before Durham, and others have noted that there was uncertainty at the time as to whether or not Durham had degree awarding powers stemming from its founding Act of Parliament, which was cleared up by it obtaining a royal charter.

Other claims
Many present-day institutions incorporate earlier foundations, such as theological colleges or medical schools, or are able to trace their origins to earlier teaching operations, and thus may be considered to have a longer heritage than those listed above. None of these make an explicit claim to have been a university at the time of the earlier teaching, or is publicly claimed to be the third oldest university in England, which is why these are listed separately from the four institutions above.

Constituent institutions
The medical school of Queen Mary, University of London – Barts and The London School of Medicine and Dentistry – incorporates St. Bartholomew's Hospital, which began unofficial medical teaching in 1123, the earliest date of known organised medical teaching in the United Kingdom.  The school also comprises one of the first official medical schools in England (the London Hospital Medical College, founded 1785); however, that school was not a university in its own right, having only prepared students for the examinations of the Royal College of Physicians, Royal College of Surgeons and the Worshipful Society of Apothecaries of London.

In the same vein, the medical school of King's College London — Guy's, King's and St Thomas' (GKT) School of Medical Education — incorporates St Thomas's Hospital Medical School, which traces its history back to the first recorded teaching in St Thomas' Hospital in 1561, and is regarded as one of the oldest medical schools. The hospital itself was founded in 1173 and traces its roots to the establishment of St Mary Overie Priory in 1106.

Wye College was founded in 1447 by John Kemp, the Archbishop of York, as a college for the training of priests. It merged with Imperial College London in 2000 and was closed in 2009. Similarly, Ushaw College of Durham University hosted until 2011 a Roman Catholic seminary that had been established in 1568 in Douai in northern France and which relocated to Ushaw Moor, four miles west of Durham in 1808 but did not become part of the university (as a Licensed Hall) until 1968. Durham University already has a much stronger claim to be the third-oldest university through its creation by Act of Parliament in 1832. Heythrop College, the specialist philosophy and theology constituent college of the University of London, was founded in 1614 in Belgium but did not move to London (after several other locations) until 1970 and became part of the university in 1971.

Predecessor institutions and earlier teaching
Of the redbrick universities and University of London institutes, arguments are made for their previous foundations as having descended from or incorporated other bodies; mainly descending from Mechanics' Institutes or medical schools formed in the early 19th century.

The University of Birmingham has traced formal medical lectures to 1767 through the Birmingham Workhouse Infirmary, a precursor to Birmingham Medical School which was founded in 1825 and received a royal charter as Queen's College, Birmingham, in 1843.

Similar claims have been made by other redbrick institutions such as the University of Liverpool through the Liverpool Royal Institution a society established 1814 "for promoting the increase and diffusion of Literature, Science and the Arts" and held lectures on these subjects (royal charter 1821, dissolved 1948), the archives of which were transferred to University College, Liverpool. A number of 'modern' universities also claim descent from earlier Mechanics' Institutes, including Liverpool John Moores University, from a Mechanics' Institute founded in 1825; Birkbeck, University of London, founded in 1823 as the London Mechanics Institute; and Leeds Beckett University from the 1824-founded Leeds Mechanics Institute. The University of Manchester traces its teaching (through the Victoria University of Manchester and Owen's College) to the Royal School of Medicine and Surgery, founded in 1824, and also (through UMIST) to the Manchester Mechanics Institute, also founded in 1824.

Other universities harken back to teaching in cathedrals and monasteries in their cities, e.g. the University of Sunderland's note that "Sunderland has been an important centre for education since 674 AD, when Benedict Biscop built St Peter's Church and monastery", and the claim by Durham University (founded by Durham Cathedral) that "Durham University is the inheritor of a continuous line of learning and scholarship dating from Bede and Cuthbert to the present day".

Figurative claims
The four Inns of Court in London, together with the associated Inns of Chancery, formed a recognised centre of legal and intellectual education, and – although never a university in any technical sense – were sometimes collectively described in the early modern period as England's "third university". Most notably, this claim was made in Sir George Buck's tract, The Third Universitie of England: Or a Treatise of the Foundations of all the Colledges, Auncient Schooles of Priviledge, and of Houses of Learning, and Liberall Arts, within and about the Most Famous Cittie of London, published in 1615 as an appendix to John Stow's Annales.

Gresham College, a higher education institute founded in London in 1597 was the first home of the Royal Society (who received their royal charter in 1662). The college was also mentioned in Buck's Third Universitie of England alongside the Inns of Court.

See also
List of UK universities by date of foundation
List of oldest universities in continuous operation
University of Wales, Lampeter, the third-oldest higher education institute in England and Wales
Ancient university
Medieval university

Notes

References

Durham University
History of King's College London
Universities in England
History of University College London
History of the University of London
Higher education in England
1820s in England
1830s in England
Controversies in England
History of education in England